"Sunday Best" is a song by American electro-pop duo Surfaces, consisting of Forrest Frank and Colin Padalecki. The song was released by TenThousand Projects and Caroline Records on January 8, 2019, as the third single from the duo's second studio album, Where the Light Is. The song's music video was released on July 11, 2019, and features the duo turning a boring office into a party place.

The song is believed to have gained popularity in late February 2020 (one year after its release) on the online-video sharing platform TikTok for its lyric "Feeling good, like I should", before it was released for radio airplay in early March 2020. The song peaked in the top 40 in Australia, Canada, Norway, Ireland, New Zealand, the UK and the United States, as well as the top 100 in Switzerland, Germany and Sweden.

Music video 
After the discovery that every day on the calendar is Sunday, a dull office is livened up by the entrance of Forrest and Colin, who introduce an extravagant, brightly colored Hawaiian theme to the room featuring a barbecue, cool drinks, and an inflatable flamingo floatie, beginning a dance party amongst the office staff.

Lyrical interpretation 
Despite many believing that the song was about carefree life with no problems, Frank said that it was not the case. He said "I see in the comments, sometimes people are like, 'This song is for people that never have anything bad happen to them... [I]magine you go through the darkest stuff of your life, like depression, anxiety or suicide...things that are really tough. It's like getting out of that and seeing the light of day and accepting who you are and accepting your situation and saying, 'I'm going to just breathe this air and have a good day.' And that's really where that song came from."

Live performances 
Surfaces made their late-night television debut when they performed the song on Late Night with Seth Meyers on March 2, 2020.

Charts

Weekly charts

Year-end charts

Certifications

References 

2019 songs
2020 singles
Surfaces (band) songs